Kristian Brenden (born 12 June 1976) is a Norwegian former ski jumper.

Career
In the World Cup he finished 29 times among the top 10 and on the podium 8 times. He won the competitions in December 1996 in Lillehammer and in January 1998 in Zakopane.

He participated in the 1998 Winter Olympics in Nagano, where he finished 8th in the normal hill, 13th in the large hill and 4th in the team event. At the 1999 FIS Nordic World Ski Championships he finished 14th in the normal hill and 17th in the large hill.

World Cup

Standings

Wins

External links

1976 births
Living people
Ski jumpers at the 1998 Winter Olympics
Olympic ski jumpers of Norway
Norwegian male ski jumpers
Sportspeople from Lillehammer